The Bernese Mountain Dog is a large dog breed, one of the four breeds of Sennenhund-type dogs from Bern, Switzerland and the Swiss Alps. These dogs have roots in the Roman mastiffs. The name Sennenhund is derived from the German Senne ("alpine pasture") and Hund (hound/dog), as they accompanied the alpine herders and dairymen called Senn. Berner (or Bernese in English) refers to the area of the breed's origin, in the canton of Bern. This breed was originally kept as a general farm dog. Large Sennenhunde in the past were also used as draft animals, pulling carts.  The breed was officially established in 1912.

Four breeds of Sennenhund 
The four breeds of Sennenhund, with the original breed name, followed by the most popular English version of the breed name are:

 Grosser Schweizer Sennenhund, Greater Swiss Mountain Dog
 Berner Sennenhund, Bernese Mountain Dog
 Appenzeller Sennenhund, Appenzeller Mountain Dog
 Entlebucher Sennenhund, Entlebucher Mountain Dog

Appearance

Colouring 
Like the other Sennenhund, the Bernese mountain dog is a large, heavy dog with a distinctive tri-colored coat, black with white chest and rust-colored markings above eyes, sides of the mouth, front of legs, and out around the white chest. However, it is the only breed of Sennenhund dogs with a long coat.  The ideal of a perfectly marked individual gives the impression of a white horseshoe shape around the nose, which is always black.  There is a white “Swiss cross” on the chest when viewed from the front. A “Swiss kiss” is a white mark located typically behind the neck, but may be a part of the neck. A full ring would not meet the type standard. The AKC breed standard lists, as disqualifications, blue eye color, and any ground color other than black.

Height and weight ranges 

Physical traits 
Considered a dry-mouthed breed, the Bernese mountain dog is slightly longer than it is tall, highly muscular, with a strong, wide back.  The head of a Bernese mountain dog is flat on the top with a moderate stop, and the ears are medium-sized, triangular, set high, and rounded at the top. The teeth have a scissors bite. The legs of the Bernese are straight and strong, with round, arched toes. The dewclaws of the Bernese are often removed. Its bushy tail is carried low.

Temperament
The breed standard for the Bernese mountain dog states that dogs should not be "aggressive, anxious or distinctly shy", but rather should be "good-natured", "self-assured", "placid towards strangers", and "docile". It only attacks if really needed (its owner is getting attacked). The temperament of individual dogs may vary, and not all examples of the breed have been bred carefully to follow the standard. All large breed dogs should be well socialized when they are puppies, and given regular training and activities throughout their lives.

Bernese are outdoor dogs at heart, though well-behaved in the house; they need activity and exercise, but do not have a great deal of endurance. They can move with amazing bursts of speed for their size when motivated. If they are sound (no problems with their hips, elbows, or other joints), they enjoy hiking and generally stick close to their people. Not being given the adequate amount of exercise may lead to barking and harassing in the Bernese.

Bernese mountain dogs are a breed that generally does well with children, as they are very affectionate. They are patient dogs that take well to children climbing over them.  Though they have great energy, a Bernese will also be happy with a calm evening.

Bernese work well with other pets and around strangers.  They are excellent guardians.  They tend to bond with one owner or family, and are somewhat aloof and standoffish towards strangers.

History 

Historically, in some locales at least, the breed was called a Dürrbachhund or Dürrbächler, for a small town (Dürrbach) where the large dogs were especially frequent.

The dogs have roots in the Roman mastiffs.

The breed was used as an all purpose farm dog for guarding property and to drive dairy cattle long distances from the farm to the alpine pastures.  The farmers used the dogs to transport their carts of milk and cheese and were known by the locals as "Cheese Dogs."  In the early 1900s, fanciers exhibited the few examples of the large dogs at shows in Berne, and in 1907 a few breeders from the Burgdorf region founded the first breed club, the Schweizerische Dürrbach-Klub, and wrote the first Standard which defined the dogs as a separate breed. By 1910, there were already 107 registered members of the breed. There is a photo of a working Bernese Mountain Dog, dated 1905 at the Fumee Fall rest area in Quinnesec, MI.

In 1937, the American Kennel Club recognized it; today, the club classifies it as a member of the Working Group. In the US the Bernese Mountain Dog is growing in popularity, ranking in 32nd place by the American Kennel Club in 2013.

These dogs are very popular as family dogs in German-speaking countries, where they are among the most popular dog breeds (for example, the German Association of Dog Breeders listed the Bernese at the 11th rank per live births in 2014).

Health

Medical problems

Cancer is the leading cause of death for dogs in general, but Bernese Mountain Dogs have a much higher rate of fatal cancer than other breeds; in both U.S./Canada and UK surveys, nearly half of Bernese Mountain Dogs die of cancer, compared to about 27% of all dogs.  Bernese Mountain Dogs are killed by many types of cancer, including malignant histiocytosis, mast cell tumor, lymphosarcoma, fibrosarcoma, and osteosarcoma. Inherited medical problems that a Bernese Mountain Dog may face include malignant histiocytosis, hypomyelinogenesis, progressive retinal atrophy, and possibly cataracts and hypoadrenocorticism. The breed is also prone to histiocytic sarcoma, a cancer of the muscle tissue that is very aggressive, and hereditary eye diseases that are common among larger dogs. A four-year-old Bernese with lymphoma named Dylan was one of the first dogs to receive chemotherapy at the Virginia-Maryland Regional College of Veterinary Medicine, and it was successful.

Bernese Mountain Dogs have an unusually high mortality due to musculoskeletal causes. Arthritis, hip dysplasia, and cruciate ligament rupture were reported as the cause of death in 6% of Bernese Mountain Dogs in the UK study; for comparison, mortality due to musculoskeletal ailments was reported to be less than 2% for pure-bred dogs in general. Owners of Bernese Mountain Dogs are nearly three times as likely as owners of other breeds to report musculoskeletal problems in their dogs; the most commonly reported being cruciate ligament rupture, arthritis (especially in shoulders and elbows), hip dysplasia, and osteochondritis.  The age at onset for musculoskeletal problems is also unusually low. In the U.S./Canada study, 11% of living dogs had arthritis at an average age of 4.3 years.  Most other common, non-musculoskeletal morbidity issues strike Berners at rates similar to other breeds. Prospective Bernese Mountain Dog owners should be prepared to cope with a large dog that may have mobility problems at a young age. Options to help mobility-impaired dogs may include ramps for car or house access, lifting harnesses and slings, and dog wheelchairs (ex: Walkin' Wheels). Comfortable bedding may help alleviate joint pain. Due to these common medical issues, owners of Bernese Mountain Dogs should make sure that their dogs receive OFA and CERF certificates.

Life expectancy
The Bernese is one of the shortest-lived dog breeds, compared both to other breeds of a similar size and to purebred dogs in general.  The average life expectancy of a Bernese Mountain Dog is approximately 8 to 9 years. Most other breeds of a similar size have median longevities of 10–11 years. In a 2004 UK survey, the longest-lived of 394 deceased Bernese Mountain Dogs died at the age of 15.2 years.

Care

Activities

The Bernese's calm temperament makes them a natural for pulling small carts or wagons, a task they originally performed in Switzerland. With proper training they enjoy giving children rides in a cart or participating in a parade, such as the Conway, New Hampshire holiday parade. Regional Bernese clubs often offer carting workshops.  Carting competitions are held for the breed.

On July 1, 2010, the Bernese Mountain Dog became eligible to compete in AKC Herding Events. Herding instincts and trainability can be measured at noncompetitive herding tests. Berners exhibiting basic herding instincts can be trained to compete in herding trials.

Grooming

Bernese Mountain Dogs shed year-round, and the heaviest shedding is during seasonal changes.  Usually the Bernese will only require a brushing once a week, with more in spring and fall, to keep its coat neat and reduce the amount of fur on the floor and furniture.  The Bernese will only require a bath about once every couple of months or so, depending on how high its activity level is and how often it spends its time in the dirt.

Special attention should be paid to the ears of the Bernese Mountain Dog, as they can trap bacteria, dirt, and liquid.  The risk of an ear infection drops with weekly ear cleanings using a veterinarian-recommended cleanser.

Notable Bernese Mountain Dogs

 Hercules is Pittsburgh Steelers quarterback Ben Roethlisberger's dog that he brought home from the Emmental region of Switzerland during a 2006 weeklong trip to discover his family's roots in the country.
Smelly and Harvey Milkbone are two Bernese Mountain Dogs owned by the characters Bryan (Andrew Rannells) and David (Justin Bartha) in the 2012 TV series The New Normal.
 Ohly was a Bernese Mountain Dog in Canada who became known after disappearing and then being found on Mount Seymour in a dangerous area known as "Suicide Gulley." Members of North Shore Rescue, a local mountain rescue team, tracked, located and rescued Ohly. 
 Quincey von Wiesmadern, has appeared in various videos with Hansi Hinterseer, an Austrian singer, entertainer and former member of the Austrian Ski Team.
 Hannah is the real-life inspiration for the protagonist of children's books such as A Beach Day for Hannah and A Snow Day for Hannah by Linda Petrie Bunch.
 Argus and Fiona were two Bernese mountain dogs that were shot and killed when they entered a neighbor's yard. The neighbor who shot the dogs admits that he was overreacting.  A Pennsylvania state law states that humans are free to kill animals attacking domestic animals. The man feared a possible attack on his sheep, who were in their fenced off grazing area. Attacks on a neighbor's farm had taken place and resulted in the death of several animals sometime the previous year, although the type of dog who attacked those animals was not a Bernese. However, since no attack was in progress at the time of the shooting, the shooter was charged with two counts of cruelty to animals and one count of recklessly endangering another person, the latter a result of there being a house within the possible line of fire. There were no residents at home at the time of the shooting.  The prosecuting attorney dithered about bringing charges.  On September 11, 2013, the shooter was convicted on two counts of animal cruelty. He faces up to five years in jail for each count.
 Izzy survived the destruction of her family's Northern California home in the October 2017 Northern California wildfires and emerged from the woods with her tail wagging as her family investigated the ruins. Family members captured the reunion on video.
 Bród and Síoda, two pet dogs of the President of Ireland Michael D. Higgins. Síoda died on September 19, 2020. In March 2021, a new puppy named Misneach was first photographed with President Higgins.
 Stella is a Bernese mountain dog in Plymouth, Michigan, who has two restaurants named after her, "Stella's Black Dog Tavern," and "Stella's Trackside." She also has a book written about her called "Introducing Stella."

Rescues 
 Nico (2015), an adopted Bernese mountain dog, became a hero when he saved two people who were being swept out into the ocean by a California rip current.
 Bella saved owner Chris Larocque from a burning house by pulling him out. The owner had reduced mobility from the injuries inflicted, and said that he would have died without Bella's help.
 Oakley (2014) saved her family, by sitting on her owner's head until he woke up, when their Vermont ski condo caught fire overnight.
 Ben, a Bernese Mountain Dog/Border Collie mix, saved his family from a fire that started after they were asleep. He alerted the babysitter who was able to get the two kids and Ben out to safety.

See also
 Dogs portal
 List of dog breeds
 Carting
 Guard dog
 Sennenhund

Notes

Explanatory footnotes

Citations

Further reading 
  Bryan, Kim; Baggaley, Ann; John, Katie (2013). The Dog Encyclopedia. New York: DK Publishing. p. 72. .
 
 
  
 Fogle, Dr. Bruce (2000). Dogalog. New York: DK Publishing. p. 340. .
 
 
 
 
 Mehus-Roe, Kristin (2005). The Original Dog Bible: the definitive source for all things dog. Irvine, California: BowTie Press. p. 258. 
 
 
 
 
 
Tedeschi, Silvana Vogel (2010). The Bernese Mountain Dog yesterday and today. Grafica 5 -Arco (TN) - Italy. .

External links

 
  A Bernese Mountain Dog bibliography.
 
"Bernese Mountain Dog Dog Breed Information". American Kennel Club. Retrieved 2020-11-01.

Canton of Bern
Dog breeds originating in Switzerland
FCI breeds
Livestock guardian dogs

:nl:Berner sennenhond